East Beacon is the prominent eastern peak, rising to  in the Beacon Heights, in the Quartermain Mountains, Victoria Land. It was named by the New Zealand Geological Survey Antarctic Expedition, 1958–59.

References 

Mountains of Victoria Land
Scott Coast